Madeleine De Meulemeester (January 8, 1904 in Bruges -  September 3, 1996 in Lincé) was a Belgian lawyer, scouts functionary and rescuer of Jewish children during the Second World War. 

With Chanoine Leclerq, she founded the Jeunesse Universitaire Catholique féminine (JUC) and the Association of Femmes Universitaires Catholiques (AFUC), which she later transferred to the scout organization Guides Catholiques de Belgique.

References

1904 births
1996 deaths
20th-century Belgian lawyers
Jurists from Bruges